Will Johns (born 22 March 1973) is an English rock singer and guitarist. Leading the Will Johns Band he has performed with renowned artists such as Joe Strummer, Ronnie Wood, Jack Bruce, and Bill Wyman. Johns is the son of record producer Andy Johns and nephew of Glyn Johns.

Early life
Johns was born in London to actress Paula Boyd and record producer Andy Johns. He first started playing guitar at age fifteen and was encouraged by Eric Clapton.  He went on to study performing arts in Oxford where he formed his first band, Cloud 9.

Career
He then moved to Los Angeles where band GLYDA was formed with Jesse Wood and Tramper Price. Johns returned to England during the mid-noughties and formed the Will Johns Band. In 2008, Johns moved to Brighton and the Will Johns Band released its first album, Count on Me, in the following year. His second album, Hooks and Lines, was released three years later through Big Bear Records.

Personal life
Johns' uncles included Eric Clapton, Mick Fleetwood and the late George Harrison.
His mother Paula Boyd is the sister of Pattie Boyd, ex-wife of George Harrison and Eric Clapton and Jenny Boyd, ex-wife of Mick Fleetwood, founder of Fleetwood Mac.

Discography
Count On Me (2009)
Hooks and Lines (2012)
Something Old, Something New... (2016)

References

External links

Review of Hooks and Lines

1973 births
Living people